Bebi Philip (born 1988) is an Ivorian singer, songwriter, guitarist and music producer, associated with styles such as Coupé-décalé.

Phillip was born in Treichville, Abidjan, Côte d'Ivoire.

References

1988 births
Living people
21st-century Ivorian male singers
People from Abidjan
Date of birth missing (living people)